A fève is a small trinket hidden in a king cake or similar dessert. They may also be known as trinkets or favors. The French word  translates to 'fava bean', which is what was originally hidden in the cake. Modern fèves can be made out of other materials, such as porcelain or plastic, and can take varied shapes and forms. The themes of fève are very diverse and may include religious symbols, tools related to baking or even depictions of famous figures. Cakes with fèves are found throughout Europe and the US and are particularly associated with Three Kings Day or Mardi Gras. The person who finds the fève usually is awarded special privileges or gifts for the day. Fèves have also become collectors items, and in France, their collectors are known as fabophiles or favophiles.

In the United States
In an American king cake – popularly eaten around Mardi Gras in New Orleans and the Gulf Coast – the fève traditionally takes the form of a small plastic or porcelain baby, symbolizing baby Jesus. Fava beans were also used to represent Jesus.

The one who finds the baby in their slice of cake is said to receive luck and prosperity, and is responsible for baking or purchasing the next year's cake, or for throwing the next Mardi Gras party. In some traditions, the finder of the baby is designated "king" or "queen" for the evening.

As plastic babies replaced beans and porcelain figures, commercial bakers have begun placing the baby outside of the cake, and leaving the hiding to the customer.  This is also because there is a potential of customers choking on or swallowing the baby, for which bakers want to avoid liability.

Gallery

Cakes that contain fèves
King cake
Rosca de reyes
Bolo-rei
Tortell
Vasilopita

References

Christmas food
Culture of New Orleans
Carnival foods
Louisiana cuisine
Cuisine of New Orleans
French desserts
French culture